The Spirogyra Butterfly Farm Park Garden,, located in San Francisco de Goicoechea, on the edge of Rio Torres, north of Zoológico Simón Bolívar, in Barrio Amon, Carmen District, San José, Costa Rica, is a butterfly house that houses from 50 to 60 different species of live butterflies from around the country in a climate-controlled, glass-enclosed habitat.

The conservatory includes flowering plants, cascading waterfalls and trees. There are also several species of free flying "butterfly friendly" birds.

There is a learning center where guests can get a close up view of a variety of live caterpillars feeding and developing on their host plants. Spirogyra Garden also works with different groups of women from rural areas of Costa Rica find alternative sources of income from field labor cultivating butterflies near forests for export.

Species 
Butterfly species in display at Spirogyra Butterfly Garden include:
 Heliconiinae: Heliconius erato, Heliconius charithonia (zebra heliconian), Heliconius hecale and Heliconius cydno
 Swallowtail butterflies: Parides iphidamas and Parides photinus
 Owl butterflies: Caligo memnon, Caligo eurilochus, and Caligo atreus 
 Pieridae: Phoebis sennae
 Morpho peleides
 Eurytides (edible)

Gallery

See also 
 List of zoos by country: Costa Rica zoos

References

Parks in Costa Rica
Urban public parks
Tourist attractions in San José Province
Botanical gardens in Costa Rica
Zoos in Costa Rica
Butterfly houses